Richard Michael Wessel (April 20, 1913 – April 20, 1965) was an American film actor who appeared in more than 270 films between 1935 and 1966. He is best remembered for his only leading role, a chilling portrayal of strangler Harry "Cueball" Lake in Dick Tracy vs. Cueball (1946), and for his appearances as comic villains opposite The Three Stooges.

Biography
Wessel was born in Milwaukee, Wisconsin. His burly frame established him as a character player in feature films of the 1930s and '40s. At first he was a bit player; in Laurel and Hardy's Bonnie Scotland (1935), he was a blacksmith's assistant (with no dialogue). Gradually his roles became larger and he was given a few lines of dialogue, as in Yankee Doodle Dandy where he played a veteran soldier. His first featured roles came in 1941, for comedy producer Hal Roach. 

In 1946 Dick Wessel began working in Columbia Pictures' two-reel comedies, often with writer-director Edward Bernds. Wessel became one of Bernds's favorites, and Bernds wrote his scripts with parts for Wessel in mind. Wessel became a fixture in Columbia shorts, as a comic foil for The Three Stooges, Andy Clyde, Hugh Herbert, Gus Schilling and Richard Lane, Sterling Holloway, Harry Von Zell, Billie Burke, and Eddie Foy, Jr. When character actor Eddie Acuff left the Blondie series, Bernds hired Dick Wessel to replace him as the hapless mailman perennially flattened by Dagwood Bumstead in his rush-hour run for the bus. In 1955 director Bernds remembered Wessel and wrote him into the Bowery Boys comedy Bowery to Bagdad.

Wessel continued to play character roles in feature films. In 1946 he landed his only leading role, as a villain opposite Morgan Conway's portrayal of Dick Tracy. Dick Tracy vs. Cueball casts Wessel as Cueball, ex-convict with shaven head, who steals valuable jewels and murders anyone in his way while he tries to reclaim them. Wessel is Mr Cracker, the affable bartender serving James Stewart in Harvey, 1950). In Frank Capra's comedy Pocketful of Miracles, based on a Damon Runyon story, he's a New York mug masquerading as the governor of Florida. 

Wessel also appeared on television. From 1959 to 1961, Wessel co-starred as Carney Kohler in all forty-two episodes of the NBC western television series Riverboat. In 1959, he appeared as police captain Bob Rattigan in the episode "Rattigan and the Cat" of the syndicated Border Patrol series. He also appeared in the syndicated crime drama Sheriff of Cochise. He was cast as Charlie in the episode "A Kind of a Stopwatch" of CBS's The Twilight Zone. He also guest starred in the CBS sitcom/drama Hennesey and on the ABC sitcom, Our Man Higgins. In 1961 he guest-starred in the series finale of The Investigators.

Wessel and his wife, Louise, had a daughter. He died of a heart attack at his home in Studio City, California on his 52nd birthday.

Selected filmography

In Spite of Danger (1935) - Monk Grady
Eight Bells (1935) - Bosun (uncredited)
Bonnie Scotland (1935) - Blacksmith's Helper (uncredited)
The Adventures of Frank Merriwell (1936, Serial) - Joe (uncredited)
Small Town Girl (1936) - College Boy in Car (uncredited)
Fury (1936) - Bodyguard (uncredited)
The Gay Desperado (1936) - On-Screen Gangster (uncredited)
Ace Drummond (1936, Serial) - Henchman Boris (uncredited)
Round-Up Time in Texas (1937) - Henchman Craig Johnson
They Gave Him a Gun (1937) - German Machine Gunner (uncredited)
San Quentin (1937) - Trusty (uncredited)
Border Cafe (1937) - Jaillbird (uncredited)
Slim (1937) - Ed
White Bondage (1937) - Beans Clerk (uncredited)
The Game That Kills (1937) - 'Leapfrog' Soule
Submarine D-1 (1937) - Sailor (uncredited)
Borrowing Trouble (1937) - Joe
Prescription for Romance (1937) - Sailor (uncredited)
A Slight Case of Murder (1938) - Partygoer Popping Cork (uncredited)
Over the Wall (1938) - Convict in Machine Shop with Gyp (uncredited)
Arson Gang Busters (1938) - Slugs
Yellow Jack (1938) - Cavalryman (uncredited)
Racket Busters (1938) - Truck Driver (uncredited)
The Crowd Roars (1938) - Fighter at Gym (uncredited)
Submarine Patrol (1938) - Dock Shore Patrolman (uncredited)
Angels with Dirty Faces (1938) - Man in Pool Room Slugged by Father Connelly (uncredited)
Hawk of the Wilderness (1938, Serial) - Dirk - Henchman
They Made Me a Criminal (1939) - Collucci
Blackwell's Island (1939) - Convict (uncredited)
The Kid from Kokomo (1939) - Shadowboxer (uncredited)
Missing Daughters (1939) - Brick McGirk
They All Come Out (1939) - Charles Moxley (uncredited)
The Cowboy Quarterback (1939) - Gyp Galbraith - Packers Player (uncredited)
I Stole a Million (1939) - 2nd Cop (uncredited)
Dust Be My Destiny (1939) - Customer (uncredited)
Hitler – Beast of Berlin (1939) - Buchman - Prison Guard (uncredited)
The Roaring Twenties (1939) - Second Mechanic (uncredited)
Main Street Lawyer (1939) - Gangster (uncredited)
Cafe Hostess (1940) - Henchman Willie
Castle on the Hudson (1940) - Convict Messenger (uncredited)
Framed (1940) - Al (uncredited)
Sandy Is a Lady (1940) - Truck Driver (uncredited)
Brother Orchid (1940) - Buffalo Burns
They Drive by Night (1940) - Driver in Café (uncredited)
Flowing Gold (1940) - Man on Dance Floor (uncredited)
The Howards of Virginia (1940) - Backwoodsman (uncredited)
City for Conquest (1940) - Cab Driver by Fire (uncredited)
So You Won't Talk (1940) - Dopey
The Border Legion (1940) - Oscar Red McGooney
Flight Command (1940) - Big Sailor on Downed Seaplane (uncredited)
Lucky Devils (1941) - Simmons (uncredited)
The Strawberry Blonde (1941) - Barber Shop Hanger-on (uncredited)
The Great Train Robbery (1941) - Gorman
Men of Boys Town (1941) - Husky Brother of Homely Girl at Dance (uncredited)
Model Wife (1941) - Laundry Man (uncredited)
Penny Serenade (1941) - Joe Connor, Man Dancing with Dotty (uncredited)
The People vs. Dr. Kildare (1941) - Blood Donor (uncredited)
Desert Bandit (1941) - Hawk - Henchman
Manpower (1941) - Lineman at Cafe Counter (uncredited)
Dive Bomber (1941) - Mechanic Who Helps Joe with Pressure Suit (uncredited)
Tanks a Million (1941) - Pvt. Monkman
Dangerous Lady (1941) - Officer Donahue (uncredited)
Navy Blues (1941) - Petty Officer (uncredited)
They Died with Their Boots On (1941) - Sgt. Brown (uncredited)
Red River Valley (1941) - Lumber Deliverer (uncredited)
Steel Against the Sky (1941) - Mike (uncredited)
Dangerously They Live (1941) - Grant, Psychopathic Ward Guard (uncredited)
You're in the Army Now (1941) - Supply Man - Shoes (uncredited)
Hay Foot (1942) - Mailman (uncredited)
The Bugle Sounds (1942) - Jerry - Saboteur (uncredited)
Brooklyn Orchid (1942) - Al, Cab Driver (uncredited)
Joe Smith, American (1942) - Aircraft Plant Worker (uncredited)
About Face (1942, Short) - Bartender Charlie
Sunday Punch (1942) - Maxie - Ken's Handler (uncredited)
Romance on the Range (1942) - Jailer (uncredited)
Yankee Doodle Dandy (1942) - Union Army Veteran #2 on Caisson (uncredited)
Tarzan's New York Adventure (1942) - First Cab Driver (uncredited)
Friendly Enemies (1942) - Delivery man
Enemy Agents Meet Ellery Queen (1942) - The Big Sailor
Sunset Serenade (1942) - Antlers Bartender (uncredited)
Bells of Capistrano (1942) - Mug / Sign-Poster #2 (uncredited)
Highways by Night (1942) - Waiter (uncredited)
You Can't Escape Forever (1942) - Moxie - Greer's Henchman (uncredited)
X Marks the Spot (1942) - Henchman Dizzy
Gentleman Jim (1942) - Referee (uncredited)
Fall In (1942) - Army Barber (uncredited)
The Traitor Within (1942) - Henchman Otis
The McGuerins from Brooklyn (1942) - Al - Cab Driver (uncredited)
Assignment in Brittany (1943) - German Sergeant (uncredited)
King of the Cowboys (1943) - Hershel (uncredited)
A Gentle Gangster (1943) - Steve Parker
Three Hearts for Julia (1943) - Soldier-Stage Manager (uncredited)
Action in the North Atlantic (1943) - Cherub Joe (uncredited)
False Faces (1943) - Detective Mallory
Yanks Ahoy (1943) - Ship Cargo Seaman (uncredited)
Silver Spurs (1943) - Buck Walters
An American Romance (1944) - Baseball Game Spectator Behind Stefan (uncredited)
Dakota (1945) - Roughneck in Saloon (uncredited)
What Next, Corporal Hargrove? (1945) - Military Police Officer (uncredited)
Scarlet Street (1945) - Detective (uncredited)
Young Widow (1946) - Cab Driver (uncredited)
Blonde Alibi (1946) - Detective (uncredited)
In Old Sacramento (1946) - Oscar
In Fast Company (1946) - Pete - Cabbie
Black Angel (1946) - Mavis' Doorman (uncredited)
Little Miss Big (1946) - Private Detective (uncredited)
Pardon My Terror (1946, Short) - Luke
No Leave, No Love (1946) - Navy Man at Union Station (uncredited)
Slappily Married (1946, Short) - Eddie--Honey's Fiancé
Dick Tracy vs. Cueball (1946) - Cueball
Gallant Bess (1946) - Marine (uncredited)
13 Rue Madeleine (1946) - Gestapo Officer (uncredited)
Blondie's Big Moment (1947) - Charlie - the Bus Driver (uncredited)
California (1947) - Blacksmith (uncredited)
Fright Night (1947, Short) - Chopper Kane
It Happened in Brooklyn (1947) - Cop (uncredited)
The Long Night (1947) - State Policeman (uncredited)
The Millerson Case (1947) - Clem Ogle, Blacksmith (uncredited)
Living in a Big Way (1947) - Sailor in Clothing Store (uncredited)
Magic Town (1947) - Moving Man (uncredited)
Merton of the Movies (1947) - Chick
High Wall (1947) - Jim Hale (uncredited)
Killer McCoy (1947) - Burns Sr. (uncredited)
The Mating of Millie (1948) - Bus Driver (uncredited)
Eight-Ball Andy (1948, Short) - Claude Beasley
The Fuller Brush Man (1948) - Police Sergeant (uncredited)
River Lady (1948) - Logger (uncredited)
The Babe Ruth Story (1948) - First Mate (scenes deleted)
A Southern Yankee (1948) - Hospital Orderly (uncredited)
Pitfall (1948) - Desk Sergeant
Hollow Triumph (1948) - Bullseye's Sidekick (uncredited)
Good Sam (1948) - Melvin Z. Wurtzberger, the Bus Driver (uncredited)
Unknown Island (1948) - Sanderson, 1st Mate
When My Baby Smiles at Me (1948) - Sailor (uncredited)
Bad Men of Tombstone (1949) - Bartender (uncredited)
Take Me Out to the Ball Game (1949) - Umpire (uncredited)
The Green Promise (1949) - Mr. Clairborne (uncredited)
Tulsa (1949) - Joker (uncredited)
Canadian Pacific (1949) - Bailey
Slattery's Hurricane (1949) - Taxi Driver (uncredited)
Blondie Hits the Jackpot (1949) - Mailman (uncredited)
Thieves' Highway (1949) - Cab Driver (uncredited)
On the Town (1949) - Sailor Kovarsky (uncredited)
Sands of Iwo Jima (1949) - Grenade Instructor (uncredited)
Punchy Cowpunchers (1950, Short) - Sgt. Mullins
Key to the City (1950) - Washing Car in Hotel Basement (uncredited)
The Kid from Texas (1950) - Deputy Bart, the Jailer (uncredited)
Blondie's Hero (1950) - Mailman (uncredited)
Wabash Avenue (1950) - John Electrician (uncredited)
Beware of Blondie (1950) - Mailman
Kill the Umpire (1950) - Catcher (uncredited)
The Jackie Robinson Story (1950) - Tough Lodge Member in Stands (uncredited)
Father of the Bride (1950) - Moving Man with Chandelier (uncredited)
Love That Brute (1950) - Fats Leslie, Gangster (uncredited)
He's a Cockeyed Wonder (1950) - Delivery Van Driver (uncredited)
Frontier Outpost (1950) - Drill Sergeant (uncredited)
Harvey (1950) - Mr. Cracker (uncredited)
Watch the Birdie (1950) - Man Who Undresses (uncredited)
The Misadventures of Buster Keaton (1950) - Harry (uncredited)
Gasoline Alley (1951) - Pudge
M (1951) - Policeman Ticketing Jaywalker (uncredited)
The Scarf (1951) - Sid (uncredited)
Francis Goes to the Races (1951) - Chuck (uncredited)
Her First Romance (1951) - Night Watchman (uncredited)
The Texas Rangers (1951) - Arkansas (uncredited)
Strangers on a Train (1951) - Bill (uncredited)
An American in Paris (1951) - Ben Macrow (uncredited)
Flying Leathernecks (1951) - Mess Sergeant (uncredited)
Corky of Gasoline Alley (1951) - Pudge McKay
Texas Carnival (1951) - Concessionaire #1
Reunion in Reno (1951) - Taxi Driver
Honeychile (1951) - Bartender
The Barefoot Mailman (1951) - Theron Henchman (uncredited)
The Belle of New York (1952) - With Wedding Gift of Stolen Silver (uncredited)
Love Is Better Than Ever (1952) - Smittie
Rancho Notorious (1952) - Deputy (uncredited)
Young Man with Ideas (1952) - Eddie Tasling
Because You're Mine (1952) - Sgt. Grogan (uncredited)
Just for You (1952) - Master Sergeant, Air Force Recruiter (uncredited)
The WAC from Walla Walla (1952) - Sgt. Malone
Blackbeard the Pirate (1952) - Dutchman
The Lawless Breed (1953) - Marv (uncredited)
Gentlemen Prefer Blondes (1953) - Chez Louis Nightclub Patron (uncredited)
Let's Do It Again (1953) - Ajax Moving Man
The Caddy (1953) - Caddy Who Rips Towel (uncredited)
Champ for a Day (1953) - 'Speedtrap' Calhoun - Policeman
Flight Nurse (1953) - Sergeant (uncredited)
Untamed Heiress (1954) - Cruncher (uncredited)
Them! (1954) - Railroad Detective (uncredited)
Bowery to Bagdad (1955) - Gus
Fling in the Ring (1955) - Chopper Kane (archive footage)
The Eternal Sea (1955) - Mike, Rivet Tosser (uncredited)
Francis in the Navy (1955) - Gas Station Attendant (uncredited)
Rebel Without a Cause (1955) - Planetarium Guide (uncredited)
Around the World in 80 Days (1956) - Train Engineer (uncredited)
The Desperados Are in Town (1956) - Hank Green
No Time for Sergeants (1958) - Drunk Infantryman at Purple Grotto (uncredited)
The Gazebo (1959) - Louis the Louse
All in a Night's Work (1961) - Janitor (uncredited)
Pocketful of Miracles (1961) - Governor of Florida (uncredited)
Wives and Lovers (1963) - Mr. Liberti
Who's Minding the Store? (1963) - Traffic Cop
The Ugly Dachshund (1966) - Eddie - Garbage Man (uncredited) (final film role)

References

External links

1913 births
1965 deaths
Male actors from Milwaukee
American male film actors
American male television actors
Male actors from Los Angeles
20th-century American male actors
People from Studio City, Los Angeles